Catharine Drew Gilpin Faust (born September 18, 1947) is an American historian and was the 28th president of Harvard University, and the first woman to serve in that role. She was Harvard's first president since 1672 without an undergraduate or graduate degree from Harvard and the first to have been raised in the South. Faust is also the founding dean of the Radcliffe Institute for Advanced Study. She has been ranked among the world's most powerful women by Forbes, including as the 33rd most powerful in 2014.

Early life 
Drew Gilpin was born in New York City and raised in Clarke County, Virginia, in the Shenandoah Valley. She is the daughter of Catharine Ginna (née Mellick) and McGhee Tyson Gilpin. Her father was a Princeton graduate and breeder of thoroughbred horses. Her paternal great-grandfather, Lawrence Tyson, was a U.S. senator from Tennessee during the 1920s. Faust also has New England ancestry and is a descendant of Jonathan Edwards, the third president of Princeton.

Education 
Faust graduated from Concord Academy, Concord, Massachusetts, in 1964. She earned a BA magna cum laude with honors in history from Bryn Mawr College in 1968. She earned an MA in American civilization from the University of Pennsylvania in 1971 and a Ph.D. in 1975, with a dissertation entitled "A Sacred Circle: The Social Role of the Intellectual in the Old South, 1840–1860".

Career 
In 1975, Faust joined the University of Pennsylvania faculty as assistant professor of American civilization. A specialist in the history of the South in the antebellum period and Civil War, Faust rose to become Walter Annenberg Professor of History.

She is the author of six books, including Mothers of Invention: Women of the Slaveholding South in the American Civil War (1996), for which she won both the Society of American Historians Francis Parkman Prize and the Avery O. Craven Award from the Organization of American Historians in 1997. Her other works include James Henry Hammond and the Old South, a biography of James Henry Hammond, Governor of South Carolina from 1842 to 1844. This Republic of Suffering (2008) was a critically acclaimed exploration of how the United States' understanding of death was shaped by the high losses during the Civil War. It was a finalist for the Pulitzer Prize and National Book Award.

In 2001, Faust was appointed the first dean of the Radcliffe Institute for Advanced Study, which was established after the merger of Radcliffe College with Harvard University.

On February 8, 2007, Faust was selected as the next president of the university. Following formal approval by the university's governing boards, her appointment was made official three days later.  Faust was the first woman to serve as president of Harvard University.

Faust replaced Lawrence Summers, who resigned on June 30, 2006, after a series of controversial statements that led to mounting criticism from members of Harvard's Faculty of Arts and Sciences. Derek Bok, who had served as president of Harvard from 1971 to 1991, returned to serve as an interim president during the 2006–2007 academic year.

During a press conference on campus, Faust said, "I hope that my own appointment can be one symbol of an opening of opportunities that would have been inconceivable even a generation ago." She also added, "I'm not the woman president of Harvard, I'm the president of Harvard."

On October 12, 2007, Faust delivered her installation address, saying, 
A university is not about results in the next quarter; it is not even about who a student has become by graduation. It is about learning that molds a lifetime, learning that transmits the heritage of millennia; learning that shapes the future.

In one of Faust's first initiatives, she significantly increased financial aid offers to students at Harvard College. On December 10, 2007, Faust announced a new policy for middle-class and upper-middle-class students, which limited parental contributions to 10 percent for families making between $100,000 and $180,000 annually, and replaced loans with grants. In announcing the policy, Faust said, "Education is the engine that makes American democracy work.... And it has to work and that means people have to have access." The new policy expanded on earlier programs that eliminated contributions for families earning less than $60,000 a year and greatly reduced costs for families earning less than $100,000. Similar policies were subsequently adopted by Stanford, Yale, and many other private U.S. universities and colleges.

In addition to promoting access to higher education, Faust has testified before the U.S. Congress to promote increased funding for scientific research and support of junior faculty researchers. She has made it a priority to revitalize the arts at Harvard and integrate them into the daily life of students and staff. Faust has worked to further internationalize the university. In addition, she has been a strong advocate for sustainability and has set an ambitious goal of reducing the university's greenhouse gas emissions by 2016, including those associated with prospective growth, by 30 percent below Harvard's 2006 baseline.

In May 2008, Christina Romer, an economics professor at the University of California, Berkeley, was not offered tenure at Harvard despite support from the members of the Harvard Economics Department. At Harvard, the confidential nature of the process includes a panel that consists of outside experts and internal faculty members from outside the department. Faust has declined to discuss press reports related to Romer's tenure case. Romer was later nominated by President Barack Obama to chair the Council of Economic Advisers. Also in Faust's tenure, Harvard's economics department witnessed an exodus of prominent faculty to Stanford and MIT, including Raj Chetty, Susan Athey, Guido Imbens, Drew Fudenberg, and Nobel Laureate Al Roth.

In the wake of a series of layoffs in June 2009, Faust was criticized for refusing to accept a pay cut that would have saved jobs. In the months preceding the layoffs, various campus groups called upon Faust and other administrators to reduce their salaries as a means of cutting costs campus-wide. Reports on Faust's salary differ: The Boston Globe reports that Faust made $775,043 in the 2007–2008 school year, while The Harvard Crimson reported that Faust made $693,739 in salary and benefits for the 2008–2009 fiscal year. In early 2009, the Harvard Corporation approved salary freezes for the president, deans, senior officers, management staff, and faculty, and offered an early retirement program. The University also undertook an involuntary reduction in staff of 2.4 percent of its employees.

Faust championed organic lawn management of the campus grounds and Harvard Yard during her tenure, including adopting the practices at Elmwood, the president’s house on Brattle Street. The move reduced the use of irrigation water by 30%, made Harvard Yard greener, and improved the health of the campus orchard.

In December 2010, Faust and Stanford University president John L. Hennessy co-wrote an editorial in support of passage of the DREAM Act. The legislation was not passed by the 111th United States Congress.

In 2011, Faust signed an agreement with Navy Secretary Ray Mabus, JD '76, to formally return the Naval Reserve Officers Training Corps (NROTC) program to campus after almost 40 years, following the repeal of the "Don't Ask Don't Tell" law in December 2010.

In 2016, Harvard began to study its history with slavery following Faust's public acknowledgement that the school was "directly complicit in America's system of racial bondage", then had a commemorative plaque installed on campus to honor the enslaved whose labor was exploited by the institution. Her successor, Lawrence Bacow, subsequently commissioned a formal study in 2019, continuing Faust's work.

Faust retired as president of Harvard College in June 2018, succeeded by Lawrence Bacow. Four days after retiring from her position as president, she joined the board of Goldman Sachs. She retains her title as a professor of history at Harvard.

Personal life
Faust is married to Charles E. Rosenberg, a historian of medicine at Harvard. Rosenberg was Faust's dissertation advisor. They have a daughter, Jessica Rosenberg, who is a Harvard graduate and works for The New Yorker. Faust also has a stepdaughter, Leah Rosenberg.

She was previously married to Stephen Faust.

Faust was diagnosed with breast cancer in 1988 and treated that year. She has enjoyed good health since then. She has declined to speak with the media with more details about her diagnosis or treatment.

Honors, affiliations and awards
 Faust was elected to the American Philosophical Society in 2007.
Named a member of the "Time 100" (2007)
 Fellow of the American Academy of Arts & Sciences
 Awarded honorary doctorates from Bowdoin College (May 2007), the University of Pennsylvania (May 2008), Yale University (May 2008), and Princeton University (May 2010).
 Faust has been included in the Forbes list of "100 Most Powerful Women" multiple times. As of 2014, she was ranked at #33. She had risen from her 2013 position at #43.
In 2011 the National Endowment for the Humanities selected Faust for the Jefferson Lecture, the U.S. federal government's highest honor for achievement in the humanities. Faust's lecture was entitled "Telling War Stories: Reflections of a Civil War Historian".
 In October 2012, Faust delivered the Sesquicentennial Address at Boston College, entitled "Scholarship and the Role of the University."
 In January 2015, Faust delivered the Rede Lecture at the University of Cambridge, entitled "Two Wars and the Long Twentieth Century: the United States, 1861–65; Britain 1914–18"
 In 2018 Faust was the recipient of the John W. Kluge Prize given by the Library of Congress, to be presented on September 12, 2018.

Awards for written works
 Received the 2009 Bancroft Prize from Columbia University for This Republic of Suffering (2008).
 Awarded the 2008 American History Book Prize for This Republic of Suffering.
 Her "Dread Void of Uncertainty" was named one of ten best history essays of 2005 by the Organization of American Historians
 Received the Francis Parkman Prize of the Society of American Historians for Mothers of Invention, 1997

Selected works
 This Republic of Suffering: Death and the American Civil War (Knopf, 2008) 
 This Republic of Suffering made the New York Times Book Review list of "10 Best Books of 2008" as chosen by the paper's editors. The book was also a finalist for the National Book Awards (2008) and the Pulitzer Prize. (2009)
The Dread Void of Uncertainty: Naming the Dead in the American Civil War (Southern Cultures, 2005)
 Mothers of Invention: Women of the Slaveholding South in the American Civil War (University of North Carolina Press, 1996) 
 Southern Stories: Slaveholders in Peace and War (University of Missouri Press, 1992) 
 The Creation of Confederate Nationalism: Ideology and Identity in the Civil War South (Louisiana State University Press, 1982) 
 James Henry Hammond and the Old South: A Design for Mastery (Louisiana State University Press, 1982) 
 A Sacred Circle: The Dilemma of the Intellectual in the Old South, 1840–1860 (University of Pennsylvania Press, 1977) 
 Necessary Trouble: Growing Up at Midcentury (Farrar, Straus and Giroux, 2023)

Filmography

References

External links

Official website – Harvard University
"Drew Gilpin Faust '68 to Lead Harvard", Bryn Mawr College
"The Search for Harvard's Next Leader: The inside story on how the Corporation's second choice became the next president of Harvard", 02138 Magazine
First Female Harvard President Discusses Priorities and Goals transcript (February 12, 2007)
"Harvard's Faust: Boundaries Remain for Women", NPR
"Review: Drew Gilpin Faust, 'This Republic of Suffering'", The Wall Street Journal

Radio interview with Faust on Fresh Air concerning This Republic of Suffering (32 min., 2012)

1947 births
Bryn Mawr College alumni
Directors of Harvard Management Company
Harvard University faculty
Historians of the American Civil War
Living people
People from Clarke County, Virginia
Writers from New York City
Presidents of Harvard University
Radcliffe College people
University of Pennsylvania alumni
American women historians
20th-century American historians
20th-century American women writers
21st-century American historians
21st-century American women writers
Concord Academy alumni
Historians from New York (state)
Women heads of universities and colleges
Bancroft Prize winners
Members of the American Philosophical Society
Historians from Virginia
Directors of Goldman Sachs